Alicia Malone is an Australian television host and author. She is a host on Turner Classic Movies.

Books
Backwards and in Heels: The Past, Present And Future Of Women Working In Film (Mango, 2018)
The Female Gaze: Essential Movies Made by Women (Mango, 2018)
Girls on Film: Lessons From a Life of Watching Women in Movies (Mango, 2022)

References

External links

Australian women television presenters
Living people
Year of birth missing (living people)